Class 58 may refer to:
 British Rail Class 58
 DRG Class 58, a group of German 2-10-0 (Decapod) freight locomotives operated by the Deutsche Reichsbahn comprising the following sub-classes:
 Class 58.0: Prussian G 12.1
 Class 58.1: Saxon XIII H (1917 variant)
 Class 58.2–3: Baden G 12
 Class 58.4: Saxon XIII H (1919 variant)
 Class 58.5: Württemberg G 12
 Class 58.6: LBE G 12
 Class 58.6II: PH O'
 Class 58.7: BBÖ 81
 Class 58.8: BBÖ 181
 Class 58.9: BBÖ 580, BBÖ 380
 Class 58.10–21: Prussian G 12
 Class 58.22: ČSD Class 534.0
 Class 58.23–27: PKP Class Ty23
 Class 58.28: TCDD 56 (seized by the DRG from 1940 to 1942)
 Class 58.29: PKP Class Ty37
 Class 58.30: a reconstructed Prussian G 12 with a new design boiler converted for the DR in East Germany